Safarbehi (also Romanized as Şafarbehī; also known as Behīşafar) is a village in Bash Qaleh Rural District, in the Central District of Urmia County, West Azerbaijan Province, Iran. At the 2006 census, its population was 339, in 101 families.

References 

Populated places in Urmia County